Pierre-Laurent Brenot ( – ), was a French painter who also had a great activity in fashion and advertising. He is also known as the father of the "French pin-up".

Biography 

Raymond (Pierre-Laurent) Brenot was born on 8 July 1913 at the 44th of rue de Vanves, in the 14th district of Paris.

In 1928, he entered the Ecole Estienne (School of the Book), which he attended for three years.

In 1932, he studied with the French designer Fernand Hertenberger. Brenot's power of observation and accuracy of pen stroke are very soon noticed.

During the "Years of Fashion" (from 1936 to 1950), thanks to his daring and his talent, he was hired by Mr. Chatard, a great dressmaker for men and women, within the store "Fashionable" based at the 16th of the Boulevard Montmartre. Brenot then created a line of men's suits. Moving forward, he made many fashion drawings for other great designers and milliners (Christian Dior, Jacques Fath, Cristóbal Balenciaga, Nina Ricci, Jeanne Lafaurie, Charles Montaigne ...) as well as for Lanvin and Rochas brands.

He soon began to draw portraits, including those of Arletty, Francoise Fabian, Boris Vian and Jean-Claude Brialy.

From 1944 onwards, he started a career as a poster artist and illustrator. However, with the rise of photography in the sixties, this activity shrank badly. Pierre-Laurent Brenot then moved backward to his original painter vocation.

Pierre-Laurent Brenot died on 8 May 1998, in his estate in Loches.

1913 births
1998 deaths
20th-century French painters
20th-century French male artists
French male painters